Tiruchendur is a municipality located in Thoothukudi District, Tamil Nadu, India. It is home to the Arulmigu Subramaniya Swamy Temple, which is one of the Six Abodes of Murugan.

Etymology

Tiruchendur, a temple town like many towns in the state of Tamil Nadu, is named after the red soil nature of the town Senthoor.

Geography

Tiruchendur is located on the shoreline overlooking the Bay of Bengal in the south-eastern part of Tamil Nadu. The suburban villages surrounding the town contain arid, red soil forests that are densely planted with palm trees, cashew plantations, and other crops part of the region.

Demographics
As of the 2001 Census of India, Tiruchendur had a population of 33,970. Males constituted 50% of the population and females 50%. Tiruchendur had an average literacy rate of 79%, higher than the national average of 59.5%. Male literacy was 82%, and female literacy 76%. 12% of Tiruchendur's population was under 6 years of age.

Politics
The Tiruchendur assembly constituency was part of the Tiruchendur (Lok Sabha constituency) until 2009. After the dissolution of the Lok Sabha constituency in May 2009, the constituency aligned with the Tuticorin Lok Sabha constituency. The current member of the legislative assembly for the Tamil Nadu assembly, elected by the general election 2021, is Anitha R. Radhakrishnan of Dravida Munnetra Kazhagam.

Public administration
Tiruchendur is managed by the Tiruchendur Town Panchayat, which has 21 wards. It is also a taluk headquarters, and there are 10 local bodies and 46 villages that come under the jurisdiction of Tiruchendur taluk. The District Munsiff Court and Judicial Magistrate Court are located in the town.

Landmark

Tiruchendur Murugan Temple
 

Arulmigu Subramaniya Swamy Temple, is an ancient Hindu temple dedicated to Murugan at the site of the battle. It is one of the six major abodes, or sacred temples,   of the Kaumaram religion. The Murugan temple at Tiruchendur was occupied by the Dutch East India company from 1646 to 1648, during the course of their war with the Portuguese.

Festivals
Festivals are celebrated throughout the year at the temple, including Brahmothsavam in the month of Maasi, Vasanthotsavam for 10 days in Chithirai, Vaikasi Visakam for 12 days and Skandha Sashti in Aippasi. There are two Maha Utsavams called Aavani perunthirunaal and Maasi perunthirunaal conducted and celebrated during Aavani and Maasi. These 12-day festivals occur twice every year.

Masi Thiruvizha

Many people congregate for Masi Thiruvizha, a 12-day festival at Tiruchendur. The Kayamozhi Athitha Nadarhal Arakattalai Mandahapadi committee organises functions on the sixth and seventh days of the festival. On the tenth day of the festival, the presiding Lord of the Tiruchendur temple makes a special appearance in Thirunelveli Dakshinamara Nadar Sangam, in Sannidhi Street.

Several thousand devotees worship at the Masi Magam festival of the Sri Subramaniawamy temple at Tiruchendur. The festival was inaugurated by the Athitha Nadar clan several centuries ago and includes ritual performances, like Pali-vidalai eridhal.

See also
 Virapandianpatnam

References

External links
 Tiruchendur Murugan Kovil
 Chendur Murugan Kovil
 Tiruchendur Muruga

Cities and towns in Thoothukudi district